Max Anderson may refer to:

Max Anderson (American football) (born 1945), American football running back and kick returner
Max Anderson (director) (1914–1959), British director of documentaries
Max Anderson (footballer) (born 2001), Scottish footballer
Maxie Anderson (1934–1983), American hot air balloonist and businessman
Maxwell L. Anderson (born 1956), American art museum director

See also
Max J. Anderson House, Kingman, Arizona